Dagmar Uebelhör  (born 10 December 1965) is a German women's international footballer who plays as a defender. She is a member of the Germany women's national football team. She was part of the team at the UEFA Women's Euro 1991. On club level she played for Bayern Munich and competed in the final at the 1987–88 DFB-Pokal (women) and 1989–90 DFB-Pokal (women).

References

1965 births
Living people
German women's footballers
Germany women's international footballers
Place of birth missing (living people)
Women's association football defenders
UEFA Women's Championship-winning players